Péré may refer to:

Péré, Charente-Maritime, a commune in the Charente-Maritime department 
Péré, Hautes-Pyrénées, a commune in the Hautes-Pyrénées department

See also 
 Pere (disambiguation)
 Pérès (plural form)